Laugh It Off may refer to:

 Laugh It Off (1939 film), an American musical directed by Albert S. Rogell 
 Laugh It Off (1940 film), a British musical comedy by John Baxter and Wallace Orton